CSI: Crime City was the eleventh video game adaptation of the CSI: Crime Scene Investigation television series, developed for Facebook by American studio area/code and published by Ubisoft. It was the third CSI game released during 2010, along with CSI: Fatal Conspiracy and CSI: Unsolved. When Case Set 12 was released, it brought the game up to 61 cases. The game has been shut down as of March 13, 2015.

Case Set 1

Case 1: Sweet Revenge
Victim(s): Tommy

Suspects: Curtis & Candy

Crime Scenes: Casino Penthouse, Strip Club Bathroom

Tommy is up on the roof of the Casino Penthouse when Candy and Curtis arrive. Tommy talks to Candy of some plan they had arranged. Tommy then asks Candy who the person standing near the door is (Curtis), Curtis then says that they had other ideas.  At the scene, Tommy is found to have been beaten and drowned in the hot tub. A lighter is found and has a fingerprint that matches Candy. They arrive at the strip club where she works and found her dead in a cubicle. At this scene, Candy's cell phone and a bag of cocaine mixed with pesticide was found. Curtis, the only remaining suspect was interrogated and was found guilty of murdering Tommy. It is also found out that Tommy poisoned the cocaine making Curtis going into a rage.

Case 2: Double Take
It all starts with the discussion of Cynthia on the lights of the stage, when she left the stage did not come back and have two suspects Mrs. Buhr and Tony, they find the murder weapon.

Case 3: Road to Nowhere
George, his wife, and his limo driver are found shot in the limo off the road. Their kids Rory & Tory are interrogated, and suspicion is raised when CSI team uncovers that they tried hacking into their dad's computer to find out how much money he has lost. Then, a clue leads them to Ralph, gun shop owner, where the murder weapon, a .38 caliber pistol and $2500 with both George and Ralph's prints on in. It turns out that after 30 years of marriage, George got terd, and wanted to kill his wife, so he asked Ralph and paid him $2500. That however pissed Ralph off because that was way too little, so he killed George and his driver, claiming that George 'stiffed' him for $2500. Brass makes a joke out of this and says that he will get an even greater 'stiff' when he gets a 25 to life sentence.

Case 5: Below the Belt
Alisson Westwood is found shot to death in her apartment. Her cellphone reveals she received a message from Arnold Gooden only minutes before she died. Evidence reveal even more suspicion, and Arnold admits having an affair with Alison, but then his son Eddy jumps in, saying that he and his dad were in gym, sparing at time of Alison's death. Two pairs of gloves are found, while the first pair had Arnold's sweat, the second ones had no sweat at all. Eddy admits murder, and killed Alison due fear that his dad would marry her.

Case Set 3

Case 1: Tilt!
Roscoe, a champion pinball player, is found dead. He appears to have multiple relationships, and a fierce rivalry with the security guard, Horace. It is soon revealed that his girlfriends beat him not quite to death, but another suspect named Gerald finished Roscoe off.

Case 2: The First Cut's The Deepest
Dr. Buford, a teacher/doctor, is found dead in his lab. He was killed by a muscle relaxant, Pancronium Bromide. Nurse Evercroft soon confesses to murder, but evidence is found which points otherwise. The CSIs then talk to Dr. Stancroft, realising both Buford and Stancroft were in love with Evercroft, and Stancroft could have wanted to get Buford out of the way. The evidence then points to an old boyfriend of Evercroft's, Daniel, who turns out to be the real killer.

Case 3: Tanked
A comedian named Timmy is drowned and FAKE is written across his shirt. The first suspect is Mara, a girlfriend whose relationship with him was rather confusing. They had a fight, which ups suspicion on Mara. Soon the Crack-Up Room owner, Isiaah, becomes a suspect, along with Timmy's replacement, Andy. It soon becomes evident Andy did it as Timmy's blood is on his shirt, and the grease pen used to write FAKE on Timmy's shirt was found with Andy's fingerprints. It turns out Timmy was stealing Andy's (hilarious) jokes, which Andy was not too happy about.

Case 4: Manslaughter
Two friends, Paul and Matt, go on a skiing vacation. While they relax, someone beats Paul to death and also beats Matt unconscious. The CSIs meet the bell hop, Dennis, who seems very suspicious, and learn of Paul's ex-wife, Cheryl. Soon they return to the crime scene and find the murder weapon, with Matt's prints on it! Matt murdered Paul and beat himself unconscious.

Case 5: Our Lady Of The Seven Veils
A burlesque dancer named Lucy is killed and dumped in a church. It seems she has been shot. At the scene, fishnets are found. Lucy was also strangled with the fishnets. Also, lipstick made with camauba wax is found. Then they interrogate Sasha, Lucy's replacement, but finds she is innocent. The church parking lot is then investigated. Beforehand, Father Wyatt is interviewed and the parking lot investigated. Finally, the CSI team are brought to the house of Lucy's daughter Amanda, who was so embarrassed due to humiliation from her classmates about her mother's profession that she killed Lucy.

Case Set 4

Case 2: What Happens In Vegas, Dies In Vegas
Cousins Monica and Olivia check into a Vegas hotel to drink, gamble and forget their troubles. The next morning Monica is found floating, face down in the hotel pool. CSI is called to investigate and discover that Monica was receiving unwanted attention from both the hotel waiter, Blake who also moonlights in the hotel spa and Pierre, another hotel guest who had shared drinks and made an unwanted play for Monica on the night of her murder. Upon further investigation CSI discover that Blake seemed to be following Monica around even swapping shifts with a colleague at the spa so that he could 'give it his best shot' with Monica and Pierre who had checked out of the hotel in a hurry leaving behind his expensive but smashed watch at the scene of the crime. Suspicion is also thrown over Monica's cousin, Olivia, who was apparently passed out in her hotel room for the duration of the day and didn't report Monica's murder/disappearance and who may also have resented all the attention being received by her beautiful cousin.

Case 1: Super Double-Cross
Sean, a dirt bike champion, is found shot in the chest at the tracks. Evidence reveal a sabotaged bike chain, and a paper from Kirkland, who invested money into Sean, got angry for Sean quitting to work with him, which makes him number one suspect. Later on, LVPD talk to Melissa, Sean's ex-girlfriend who got fired by him. A car oil used to sabotage Sean's bike is found, but she isn't found guilty. Afterwards, Melissa leads them to Wilkins, the second best dirt biker, who had a lot to gain by Sean's death. Soon, a gun used to kill Sean is found, as well as Wilkins' laptop where a lot of emails from the bookies are found, who wanted Sean to fall so they could win a lot of money, out of which some was planned for Wilkins. A car oil is also found which was used for bike sabotage. Wilkins admits killing Sean because Sean didn't agree to fall deliberately.

Case 5: Cinema verite
Victor, a cinema guy is found beaten to death in the backstage. Police question Debbie, the film critic who hated the film and didn't want it to be shown. Police then question Allen, her husband, who owns a video store across. He was getting into fights with Victor, and had a motive for murder. However, Alexi turned out to be the killer, being captured on the tape outside video store. He acted in the movie, but apparently hated it so much, that he did not want it to be shown, so he beat Victor.

Case Set 5

Case 1: If It Bleeds, It Leads
Mariano, a new reader, dies in a heart attack while delivering the morning news with his news partner Gloria.

Case Set 12

Case 1: Killer Grades
Lucas was found dead at class when his teacher left for a while. Found out that he was force fed with pills, they track down who had put a  streak of lipstick found from his shirt. You will later find out that his mother, bewbi, misunderstood him to be sick.

Case 4: Cherry Cherry Murder
Randall was found at her workplace toppled down by a slot. From the evidence discovered, it can be concluded that Randall and his co-worker, Lucas, are the only employees working in the  factory during Jasmine's death. The team search out evidence over Randall's Office. Then, astounded, they search for clues over Randall's condo. After interrogating Hugh, Jasmine's boyfriend, they found themselves proof that Hugh is the killer. First, her cellphone. Hugh kept calling her, but Jasmine ignores all of it. Second, the grease stains from his pants are similar to the slot that pinned down Jasmine. Hugh was accused of voluntary manslaughter.

Case 5: Soup's On
Spencer, an employee in a chemical factory, found a puddle shaped like a body while at work. When the CSI team came in, they already have their first three suspects: Spencer, Holly, another colleague, and the manager, Dean Colton. Having told that a certain employee named Philip has gone missing, the team discovers that the acid puddle was from Philip's body. They next search out over Dean Colton's office. From the evidence, Philip was found to be lazy worker. He also threatens Dean to make a complaint through an agency, which can put Dean's office in jeopardy. Then, they went through Holly's Office to investigate some files. In the evidence found, the files point out that they must search out over the shelving unit over the place where the puddle is. Dust voids were found and this proves that the tub full of hydrochloric acid hits Philip and pours onto his body. A nail with a strand of hair, which belongs  to Spencer, was also found above which leads him to involuntary manslaughter. He did this when taking a nap above.

External links
 CSI: Crime City official Facebook Page
 CSI: Crime City trailer

Crime City
Ubisoft games
2010 video games
Detective video games
Facebook games
Video games about police officers
Video games developed in the United States
Video games set in the Las Vegas Valley